Jim Mothersbaugh (born January 18, 1956) is an American electronic engineer and former musician. He was the second drummer of the new wave band Devo, replacing Rod Reisman who played for only one show. Mothersbaugh joined Devo with his older brothers, Bob and Mark. He was in the band from 1973 to 1976.

Mothersbaugh appears on several early Devo demos. Later on, he performed as an equipment technician for the band on the 1980 tour, and worked at Roland through much of the 1980s helping to develop MIDI technology.

Currently, he is the president of Circle Prime Manufacturing, an electronics contract manufacturing company in Cuyahoga Falls, Ohio, that has produced devices for the U.S. military, aerospace, and commercial clients. He lives in Akron, Ohio, raising his son, Jacob and daughter, Rachel. He makes appearances at the DEVOtionals – an annual Devo fan gathering in Ohio which has been held in both Akron and Cleveland.

References

External links

Official company website
 MIDI Technology

1956 births
Living people
American rock drummers
Devo members
Musicians from Akron, Ohio
20th-century American drummers
American male drummers